Sir Ernest Varvill Hiley, KBE (1868–1949) was Conservative MP for Birmingham Duddeston

Originally a solicitor, he was town clerk of Leicester and Birmingham.  He was knighted in 1917.

He was elected as an MP in 1922 but stood down in 1923, an unusually short term.

He later served on two Royal Commissions.

Sources

External links
 

Conservative Party (UK) MPs for English constituencies
Politics of Birmingham, West Midlands
1868 births
1949 deaths
Knights Commander of the Order of the British Empire
English solicitors